Henri Betti, born Ange Betti (24 July 1917 – 7 July 2005), was a French composer and a pianist.

Pianist and composer of Maurice Chevalier from 1940 to 1945, Henri Betti is best known for composing the music of the songs C'est si bon (lyrics by André Hornez), What Can I Do ? (lyrics by Édith Piaf) and The Windmill Song (lyrics by Jacques Plante) that were performed by Yves Montand.

Biography 

Henri Betti was born at 1 rue Barillerie in the district of Vieux-Nice in a modest family : his father was a house painter and his mother was a fishmonger. His paternal family originates from the region of Emilia-Romagna in Italy : his grandfather was born in Parma and he immigrated to Nice with his wife and children in 1893.

In 1935, he entered at the Conservatoire de Paris which is then directed by Henri Rabaud where he studied music in the same class as Maurice Baquet, Paul Bonneau, Henri Dutilleux and Louiguy. He is the student of Lazare Lévy for piano class and Raymond Pech for harmony class. He won a prize of harmony in 1937.

He then headed for a classical pianist, but in 1940, when he has been discharged from military service of Fortified Sector of the Dauphiné in Briançon, he crosses the Corsican composer Roger Lucchesi on the Promenade des Anglais, who told him that he composed a song for Maurice Chevalier and asked him to accompany him to the piano when he the present him in his property La Louque in Cannes. Maurice Chevalier refuse the song but to ask Henri Betti be his regular accompanist. During the singing tours, he will make him play the Ballade No. 1 in G minor, Op. 23 by Frédéric Chopin between songs. Anxious to renew his repertoire, he also asked him to compose songs. Henri Betti then wrote music forty songs with the lyrics of Maurice Chevalier and Maurice Vandair until 1945 that Notre Espoir and La Chanson du maçon in 1941 or La Fête à Neu-Neu in 1943. Of the fifteen securities singing tour of Maurice Chevalier in 1945, Henri Betti sign fourteen.

He joined the SACEM in 1941 as composer and was appointed Sociétaire définitif in 1949.

After World War II, he knows great success with Le Régiment des mandolines in 1946 and Le Chapeau à plumes in 1947 for Lily Fayol, Mais qu’est-ce que j’ai ? in 1947, Maître Pierre and Rien dans les mains, rien dans les poches in 1948 for Yves Montand and especially C'est si bon in 1947 for Jean Marco with Jacques Hélian and his Orchestra. The song is sung by Yves Montand before becoming a standard international jazz with Louis Armstrong, who recorded for the first time in New York in 1950 in the English version of Jerry Seelen.

From 1949 to 1983, his music production is abundant : revues for Le Lido, the Moulin Rouge, the Folies Bergère, the Olympia, the Stardust and the Tropicana in Las Vegas, and many operettas and plays.

He has also composed for the cinema in the 1950s and television in the 1960s. His most famous soundtrack is that of Honoré de Marseille which will nearly 4 million admissions in France in 1957. In this movie, Fernandel sings three songs composed by Henri Betti and the words by Jean Manse. Henri Betti and Jean Manse had written a fourth song for the movie, C'est Noël, sung by Fernandel in a scene that was edited out. The song was later sung by Tino Rossi and Georges Guétary. In 1953, he played the role of the composer and accompanist of the company of Jean Nohain in Soyez les bienvenus by Pierre-Louis which he also composed the music for the film.

In the early 1950s, he made her singing on stage first as vedette américaine featuring at the ABC in 1951 and the Theatre des Deux Anes, in parisian cabarets as Le Bosphore and Chez Tonton, and in summer outdoors in Nice, Cannes, Juan-les-Pins shows. And then as a full-featured except to Bobino and Gaumont-Palace. His talent manager was Johnny Stark.

During his career as a musician, Henri Betti worked with the composers Paul Bonneau, Gérard Calvi, Bruno Coquatrix, Jean-Pierre Landreau and Rolf Marbot and with the lyricists André Berthomieu, Bourvil, Jean Boyer, Charlys, Maurice Chevalier, Jean Cosmos, Pierre Cour, Yves Favier, Pierre Gilbert, André Hornez, Jean Le Seyeux, Francis Lopez, Jean Manse, Jacques Mareuil, Jean Nohain, Édith Piaf, Jacques Pills, Jacques Plante, René Rouzaud, André Salvet, Pascal Sevran, Maurice Vandair, Henri Varna, Raymond Vincy and Albert Willemetz.

In 1951, he participated with Albert Willemetz to the foundation of the Comité du Cœur, relief fund for needy artists under the auspices of the SACEM, which will be Vice-President.

In 1958, he collaborated with Jean-Pierre Landreau to compose all the music revues of Lido for the company Lido-Mélodies whose two founding members are Jean Gruyer and Pierre Delvincourt.

In 1959, he collaborated with Bruno Coquatrix to compose the music of Paris mes amours and Avec (lyrics by André Hornez) which were performed by Josephine Baker at the Olympia.

In 1960, he wrote the music for the song Les Étangs de Sologne with the lyrics by Paul Vialar which was sung the same year by Jean Philippe in the TV show Toute la Chanson.

In 1971, he participated with Maurice Lehmann to the foundation of the ANAO (Association Nationale des Amis de l’Opérette) which will be Vice-President.

He was member of Conseil d'administration of the SACD from 1961 to 1975 and of the SACEM in 1982, 1983, from 1985 to 1987 and from 1989 to 1992.

In 1987, he composed the music for his last song with lyrics of Pascal Sevran : C'est à Brasilia, performed by Les Sœurs Étienne.

In 1993, he published his autobiography, C'est si bon !, published by La Pensée Universelle.

In 2003, he entered the nursing home Ger'Home in Courbevoie where he died two years later of natural causes at the age of 87 years.

His funeral held at the Eglise Saint-Pierre de Neuilly-sur-Seine, he is then cremated at the crematorium of Fort Mont-Valérien and buried in the Neuilly-sur-Seine community cemetery (Division 11).

Personal life 
Henri Betti married on 30 July 1949 in Bois-Colombes with the dancer Françoise Engels, met on the operetta Baratin that same year. His wedding witnesses were Bruno Coquatrix and André Hornez. The couple had three children and the godfather and godmother of their first child were André Hornez and Paulette Coquatrix.

Henri Betti was the brother of Freda Betti and the great granduncle of Alexy Bosetti.

Awards 
Prix Daris with Maurice Chevalier and Maurice Vandair for La Chanson du maçon in 1942.
Chevalier of the Ordre des Palmes Académiques in 1960.
Prix Maurice-Yvain by the SACD in 1980.
Médaille by the SDRM in 1985.
Médaille by the SACEM in 1991 and 1994.

Tribute 
In 2006, his son François Betti realized the musical engravings and wrote the comments of the songbook Une Vie en Chansons. In this album which is published by Paul Beuscher, there are the musical scores of 12 songs of Henri Betti : Notre espoir (lyrics by Maurice Chevalier), La Chanson du maçon,  Chanson Populaire (lyrics by Maurice Chevalier and Maurice Vandair), Le Régiment des mandolines (lyrics by Maurice Vandair), C'est si bon (lyrics by André Hornez), Mais qu’est-ce que j’ai ? (lyrics by Édith Piaf), Rien dans les mains, rien dans les poches (lyrics by André Hornez), Maître Pierre (lyrics by Jacques Plante), Toutes les femmes, Deux amoureux sur un banc, Elle et lui (lyrics by André Hornez) and Comme c'est bon chez toi (lyrics by Pierre Cour).

In 2018, Benoît Duteurtre hosted a radio show, Étonnez-moi Benoît, about Henri Betti's career with the participation of the composer's son and grandson: François and Olivier Betti. In this radio program, which was broadcast on France Musique on 28 April, were 10 songs by Henri Betti: Le Régiment des mandolines (by Lily Fayol), Tout ça c'est Marseille (by Fernandel), Notre espoir (by Maurice Chevalier), Mais qu’est-ce que j’ai ? (by Yves Montand), C'est si bon (by Jean Marco and the Étienne Sisters), Les Baobabs (by Roger Nicolas), Je cherche un cœur (by Jacques Pills), Grenelle (by Suzy Delair), Il fait beau (by Tino Rossi) and La Chanson du maçon (by Maurice Chevalier).

The same year, a square located on rue Saint-Joseph in Nice took his name.

Works

Songs by singers

Songs composed in collaboration 
 1957 :
 L'Auberge Fleurie, music written with Rolf Marbot, performed by Rudy Hirigoyen, orchestrated by Paul Bonneau.
 1958 :
 Si tu Voulais m'Aimer, music written with Jean-Pierre Landreau, performed by Tino Rossi, orchestrated by Pierre Spiers.
 1959 :
 Avec and Paris mes Amours, music written with Bruno Coquatrix, performed by Josephine Baker, orchestrated by Jo Bouillon.

Songs orchestrated 
 1941 :
 Amuse-toi, Arc-en-Ciel, Le Régiment des Jambes Louis XV, Notre Espoir, On Veut tant s'Aimer and Vous ne Direz pas toujours Non (music by Jean Marion), performed by Maurice Chevalier.
 1945 :
C'est la Fête au Pays (music by Henri Bourtayre), Chanson Populaire, Le p'tit Père la Taupe and Mandarinade, performed by Maurice Chevalier.
 1948 :
Maître Pierre, performed by Yves Montand.
 1950 :
Comment me Préférez-vous ?, Confidences, Je Cherche un Cœur and La Pagaïa, performed by Jacques Pills.
 1963 :
Consuela, Marche Grecque, Mon Grand and Paris-Paname, performed by Jean-Pierre Darras and Philippe Noiret.

Songs performed 
 1946 :
Le Régiment des Mandolines (in duet with Jo Charrier), orchestrated by Jacques Hélian.
 1949 :
Les Baobabs, orchestrated by Ray Ventura.
 1950 :
Maître Pierre (at the radio), orchestrated by Paul Durand.

Songs adapted in English 
 1949 :
 C'est si bon, lyrics by Jerry Seelen, performed by Johnny Desmond.
 Mais qu’est-ce que j’ai ? (English title : What Can I Do ?), lyrics by Harold Rome, performed by Madelyn Russell.
 1951 :
 Maître Pierre (English title : The Windmill Song), lyrics by Mitchell Parish, performed by The Andrews Sisters.
 1956 :
 Donnez-moi tout ça (English title : Give Me More), lyrics by William Engvick, performed by Don Cherry.

Cinema

Film scores 
 1952 : Le Dernier Robin des Bois by André Berthomieu.
 1953 : Cent francs par seconde by Jean Boyer.
 1953 : Soyez les bienvenus by Pierre-Louis.
 1953 : Le portrait de son père by André Berthomieu.
 1954 : L'Œil en coulisses by André Berthomieu.
 1954 : Les deux font la paire by André Berthomieu.
 1955 : Les Duraton by André Berthomieu.
 1956 : La Joyeuse Prison by André Berthomieu.
 1956 : Baratin by Jean Stelli.
 1956 : Honoré de Marseille by Maurice Régamey.
 1957 : L'Auberge en folie by Pierre Chevalier.
 1959 : Cigarettes, whisky et p'tites pépées by Maurice Régamey.
 1959 : Visa pour l'enfer by Alfred Rode.

Television scores 
 1963 : La voix dans le verre by Lazare Iglesis.
 1963 : L’un d’entre vous by Lazare Iglesis.
 1963 : Blagapar : les Grecs by Lazare Iglesis.
 1964 : Blagapar : les Contractuels by Jean-Paul Sassy.
 1964 : Blagapar : Versailles by Lazare Iglesias.
 1966 : L’école des cocottes by Lazare Iglesis.
 1966 : Comment ne pas épouser un Milliardaire by Lazare Iglesis.
 1966 : La Chasse au météore by Lazare Iglesis.
 1970 : Ne vous fâchez pas Imogène by Lazare Iglesis.
 1971 : La petite Catherine by Lazare Iglesis.

Operettas 
1946-1947 : Mam'zelle Printemps by Maurice Poggi at the Théâtre Moncey, libretto by Georges-Marie Bernanose, lyrics by Maurice Vandair.
1949-1952 : Baratin by Alfred Pasquali at the Théâtre de l'Européen, libretto by Jean Valmy, lyrics by André Hornez.
1950-1951 : L'École des Femmes Nues by Max Révol at the Théâtre de l'Étoile, libretto by Serge Veber, lyrics by Jean Boyer.
1953-1954 : Mobilette by Jean-Marc Thibault at the Théâtre de l'Européen, libretto by Serge Veber, lyrics by André Hornez.
1957-1958 : Maria Flora by Maurice Lehmann at the Théâtre du Châtelet, libretto and lyrics by Raymond Vincy.
1969-1970 : Le Marchand de Soleil by Robert Manuel at the Théâtre Mogador, libretto by Robert Thomas, lyrics by Jacques Mareuil.

Theater 
 1958-1959 : Ta bouche bébé by Maurice Poggi at the Comédie-Caumartin, dialogues by Yvan Audouard and Jean Valmy.
 1959-1960 : Ballets Rosses by Maurice Poggi at the Comédie-Caumartin, dialogues by Yvan Audouard and Jean Valmy.
 1960-1961 : Vive de... by René Dupuy at the Théâtre Gramont, dialogues by Jacques Grello, Robert Rocca and Pierre Tchernia.
 1960-1961 : Le Mobile by Jean-Pierre Grenier at the Théâtre Fontaine, dialogues by Alexandre Rivemale.
 1961-1962 : Un certain Monsieur Blot by René Dupuy at the Théâtre Gramont, dialogues by Robert Rocca.
 1961-1962 : Les Béhohènes by Jean-Pierre Darras at the Théâtre du Vieux-Colombier, dialogues by Jean Cosmos.

Revues 
At the Casino de Paris
1942 : Pour toi Paris
At the Folies Bergère
1952-1954 : Une Vraie Folie.
1955-1957 : Ah ! Quelle Folie.
1958-1960 : Folies Légères.
1961-1963 : Folies Chéries.
1964-1967 : Folies en Fêtes.
1968-1971 : Et vive la Folie.
1972-1976 : J’Aime à la Folie.
1977-1981 : Folies, je t’Adore.
1982-1986 : Folies de Paris.
At the Le Lido
1956 : C’est Magnifique.
1957-1958 : Prestige.
1959-1960 : Avec Plaisir.
1961 : Pour Vous.
1962-1963 : Suivez-Moi.
At the Olympia
1959-1960 : Paris mes Amours.
At the Moulin Rouge
1963-1964 : Frou Frou.
1965-1966 : Frisson.
1967-1969 : Fascination.
1970-1972 : Fantastic.
1973-1975 : Festival.
1976-1978 : Follement.
1979-1982 : Frénésie.
1983-1988 : Femmes, Femmes, Femmes.
At the Broadway Theatre
1964 : Folies Bergère.

Appearances

Cinema

Short film 
 1951 : Compositeurs et Chansons de Paris by Henri Verneuil.
 1953 : Trois hommes et un piano by André Berthomieu.
 1957 : Rendez-vous avec Maurice Chevalier n°2 by Maurice Régamey.
 1960 : Le Rondon by André Berthomieu.

Feature film 
 1953 : Soyez les bienvenus by Pierre-Louis.
 1954 : Les deux font la paire  by André Berthomieu.
 1954 : L'Œil en coulisses  by André Berthomieu.

Television

Television show 
 1956 : 36 Chandelles (30 January) -  RTF.
 1956 : La Joie de Vivre (3 April) - RTF.
 1957 : 36 Chansons (27 January and 10 March) - RTF.
 1958 : 36 Chandelles (28 April) - RTF.
 1959 : Les Joies de la Vie (6 April) - RTF.
 1960 : Toute la Chanson (27 June) - RTF.
 1960 : Rue de la Gaîté (20 October) - RTF.
 1960 : Au-delà de l'Écran (23 October) - RTF.
 1960 : Discorama (18 November) - RTF.
 1968 : Tel quel (30 January) - ORTF.
 1985 : Thé Dansant (9 June) - France 2.
 1988 : Soir 3 (11 September) - France 3.
 1988 : La Chance aux Chansons (15 September) - TF1.
 1990 : Midi 3 (30 March) - France 3.
 1993 : La Chance aux Chansons (15 and 16 March) - France 2.
 2001 : Les Refrains de la Mémoire (30 September) - France 5.

Documentary film 
 1962 : Dans la Vie faut pas s'en Faire by Georges Folgoas - RTF.
 1972 : Hommage à Maurice Chevalier by Georges Paumier  - ORTF.
 1979 : Nous les Artistes : Maurice Chevalier by Catherine Dupuis - TF1.

Bibliography 
 Henri Betti : Récit autobiographique, Embrasure, Paris, 1993.
 Henri Betti : une Vie en chansons, Paul Beuscher, Paris, 2006.

Discography 
 Les Chansons de ma Jeunesse : Henri Betti, Marianne Mélodie, Roubaix, 2016.

References

External links 
 
 
 
 
 Henri Betti at the AlloCiné
 Henri Betti at the Bibliothèque nationale de France
 Henri Betti at the Discogs
 Henri Betti at the Gallica
 Henri Betti at the Unifrance
 Henri Betti at the Opérette
 Henri Betti at the Les Archives du Spectacle
 Henri Betti at the Ciné Fiches
 Henri Betti at the Ciné-Ressources
 Henri Betti at the Figaro interactif
 Henri Betti at the Les Gens du Cinéma
 Henri Betti at the Hall de la chanson
 Henri Betti at the Notre Cinéma
 Henri Betti at the Cimetières de France et d’ailleurs
 Henri Betti at the Geneastar

French composers
French male composers
20th-century French male pianists
1917 births
2005 deaths
Musicians from Nice
People of Emilian descent
French people of Italian descent
Chevaliers of the Ordre des Palmes Académiques
Burials at Neuilly-sur-Seine community cemetery